Willowbank is the second studio album by New Zealand band Yumi Zouma. It was released on 6 October 2017 through Cascine.

Accolades

Track listing

References

2017 albums